"It Was a Very Good Year" is a song composed by Ervin Drake in 1961 and originally recorded by Bob Shane with the Kingston Trio. It was made famous by Frank Sinatra's version in D minor, which won the Grammy Award for Best Male Vocal Performance in 1966 and became Sinatra's first number one Adult Contemporary single, also peaking at No. 28 on the Hot 100.

Description
The nostalgic  and melancholic song recounts the type of girls with whom the singer had relationships at various years in his life: when he was 17, "small-town girls ... on the village green"; at 21, "city girls who lived up the stairs"; at 35, "blue-blooded girls of independent means".  Each of these years he calls "very good".  In the song's final verse, the singer reflects that he is older, and in the autumn of his years, and he thinks back on his entire life "as vintage wine".  All of these romances were sweet to him, like a wine from a very good (i.e., vintage) year.

Composition
Drake composed the song in 1961 at the suggestion of record producer Artie Mogull, who told Drake that Bob Shane of The Kingston Trio needed a solo to include in the group's upcoming album Goin' Places. Drake wrote the song in less than a day, although he had been considering employing the metaphor of life as a vintage wine in a lyric for several years prior.

Ervin Drake's inspiration to write the song was his then wife-to-be, Edith Vincent Bermaine. She was a showgirl whom he had dated and eventually married twenty years after the song was written.

Notable recordings

 The Kingston Trio introduced the song on their album Goin' Places (1961). This is the recording that influenced Frank Sinatra to want to record his own version.
 Lonnie Donegan released it as a 45 rpm single on Pye Records, in 1963.
The Modern Folk Quartet recorded it on their eponymous first album The Modern Folk Quartet (1963).
 Frank Sinatra on his September of My Years album (1965) and a stripped-down performance on his Sinatra at the Sands live album (1966)
 The Turtles had a Canadian hit with their version (Quality 1791X) in early 1966.
 William Shatner released a spoken-word rendition with instrumental accompaniment on his 1968 album The Transformed Man, juxtaposed with an excerpt from Hamlet.
 The Reverend Horton Heat recorded a version of the song that released as a single in 2000.
 British pop star Robbie Williams recorded a version for his album Swing When You're Winning (2001), in duet with Sinatra's original vocals. The instrumental track was also sampled from Sinatra's original recording.
 Australian entertainer Bob Downe performed a unique rendition of the song replacing the original lyrics with Australian references during his Viva Bob Vegas Tour of 2022.

In popular media
 In 1971, Michael Jackson sang a parody of this song in a skit with Diana Ross during the television special Diana!, which aired on the ABC-TV network.
 Mel Tormé hosted a 1971 summer television show named It Was a Very Good Year, using the song as opening and closing theme music.
 In 1979, the Muppets Statler and Waldorf sang the song on episode 406 of the Muppet Show.
 Frank Sinatra's version of the song was featured in the Spike Lee film Jungle Fever (1991).
 In a 1993 episode of The Simpsons ("Duffless"), Homer sings a parody of this song entitled "I Drank Some Very Good Beer", recounting the first beer he ever purchased (with a fake ID, on which the name was Brian McGee), and he "stayed up listening to Queen."
 Sinatra's version was used in the opening of the second season of The Sopranos (2000), during a montage showing the characters' activities over the previous year.
 In 2005, They Might Be Giants parodied this song on their first podcast.
This song appeared in the movie 'War of the Worlds' directed by Steve Spielberg (2005).
 Alain Resnais used the Sinatra recording over the closing credits of his film You Ain't Seen Nothin' Yet (2012).

See also
List of number-one adult contemporary singles of 1966 (U.S.)

References

1961 songs
1966 singles
Frank Sinatra songs
Reprise Records singles
Songs about old age
Songs about nostalgia
Grammy Award for Best Male Pop Vocal Performance
Grammy Award for Best Instrumental Arrangement Accompanying Vocalist(s)
Songs written by Ervin Drake